Suzanne Kirk (born 5 March 1969) is a former British rower. She competed in the women's coxless four event at the 1992 Summer Olympics. She won the coxless pairs national title with Adrienne Grimsditch, rowing for the GB national team at the 1990 National Championships.

References

External links
 

1969 births
Living people
British female rowers
Olympic rowers of Great Britain
Rowers at the 1992 Summer Olympics